Dr. Chelsea Laden (born September 12, 1992) is an American television creator and retired ice hockey goaltender, who played with the Connecticut Whale and New York Riveters of the Premier Hockey Federation (PHF).

Playing career 
During her teenage years, she played ice hockey for Lakeville South High School in Lakeville, Minnesota, serving as team captain twice and earning all-state MVP honours four times.

From 2011 to 2015, she played NCAA Division I women's ice hockey with the Quinnipiac Bobcats of ECAC Hockey, serving as the starting goaltender of the women's hockey programme in her junior and senior seasons. As a freshman, she was named ECAC Hockey Rookie of the Week for the week of November 29, 2011, and notched her first career collegiate shutout in a 3–0 victory over Syracuse in January 2012. She was named ECAC Hockey Goaltender of the Month in October 2013 and was a three-time ECAC Hockey All-Academic Team selection.

After graduating from Quinnipiac, she was ready to end her ice hockey career due to a lack of viable opportunities in the sport. However, when the PHF (then NWHL) was founded that summer by Dani Rylan, she was able to sign her first professional contract, worth $14,000, with the Connecticut Whale. She made her PHF debut in late October 2015, backstopping four third-period penalty kills in a victory over the Buffalo Beauts, the first away victory in Whale franchise history. She then missed several months of the season dealing with a finger injury. In February 2016, she became part of the first-ever trade in PHF history, being traded to the New York Riveters in exchange for Shenae Lundberg.

Television career 
In 2019, she began starring in a Travel Channel original paranormal television show called Destination Fear along with her brother, Dakota Laden, and friends Tanner Wiseman and Alex Schroeder. The show follows the group of self-proclaimed 'paranormal explorers' as they travel to reportedly haunted and paranormal hotspots across the United States and then one of the team members sleeps solo overnight at each haunted location and record their experiences. The Ladens and Wiseman had previously produced a similarly-themed documentary called Trail to Terror in 2016. The documentary was shown in Theatres at Mall of America in Bloomington, Minnesota on October 29, 2016.

Television

Personal life 
Laden was born on September 12, 1992, in Lakeville, Minnesota to Rob and Polly Laden. She has four siblings, an older sister Mykenna, and younger siblings Dakota, Tavian, and Isabella. She is currently engaged to Jake Rancic who she met while they were both studying at Illinois College of Optometry.

Laden has a bachelor's degree in pre-medical sciences from Quinnipiac University and a Doctor of Optometry degree from Illinois College of Optometry.

References

External links

1992 births
Living people
American women's ice hockey goaltenders
Paranormal investigators
Ice hockey players from Minnesota
People from Lakeville, Minnesota
Metropolitan Riveters players
Connecticut Whale (PHF) players
Quinnipiac Bobcats women's ice hockey players